Sara Elizabeth Murray  (born November 1968) is a British entrepreneur and businesswoman who developed buddi, a miniaturised tracking device for vulnerable people and founder of confused.com. She is member of the British Government’s Technology Strategy Board and Seedcamp - an organisation to jumpstart the entrepreneurial community in the UK and Europe.

Education
Born in Lancashire in November 1968, Murray went to Malvern Girls' College and then read Physiology, Psychology and Philosophy at St Hilda's College, Oxford.

Awards
Murray was named Entrepreneur of the Year at the 2009 Orange National Business Awards.
 
In 2008, Murray was a finalist in the Blackberry Awards for Women in Technology and a finalist in the Real Business First Woman Awards.

She was appointed Officer of the Order of the British Empire (OBE) in the 2012 Birthday Honours for services to entrepreneurship and innovation.

References 

British businesspeople
1968 births
Living people
Officers of the Order of the British Empire